Helmut Schönfelder (30 April 1914 – 23 September 2003) was a Luftwaffe ace and recipient of the Knight's Cross of the Iron Cross during World War II.  The Knight's Cross of the Iron Cross was awarded to recognise extreme battlefield bravery or successful military leadership. Schönfelder was credited with 56 aerial victories.

Summary of career

Aerial victory claims
According to US historian David T. Zabecki, Schönfelder was credited with 56 aerial victories. Mathews and Foreman, authors of Luftwaffe Aces – Biographies and Victory Claims, researched the German Federal Archives and state that he claimed 56 aerial victory, all of which on the Eastern Front.

Awards
 Flugzeugführerabzeichen
 Front Flying Clasp of the Luftwaffe
 Iron Cross (1939) 2nd and 1st Class
 Honour Goblet of the Luftwaffe on 19 June 1944 as Oberfeldwebel and pilot
 German Cross in Gold on 1 January 1945 as Oberfeldwebel in the Stabstaffel/Jagdgeschwader 51
 Knight's Cross of the Iron Cross on 31 March 1945 as Oberfeldwebel and pilot in the Stabstaffel/Jagdgeschwader 51 "Mölders"

References

Citations

Bibliography

 
 
 
 
 
 
 
 
 

1914 births
2003 deaths
People from Nienburg, Lower Saxony
People from the Province of Hanover
Luftwaffe pilots
German World War II flying aces
Recipients of the Gold German Cross
Recipients of the Knight's Cross of the Iron Cross
Military personnel from Lower Saxony